NNT could refer to:

 Nan Airport, Thailand; IATA airport code NNT
 The Nakai–Nam Theun National Biodiversity Conservation Area in Laos
 Nassim Nicholas Taleb
 Number needed to treat, an epidemiological measure
 Nunthorpe railway station, England;  National Rail station code NNT
  NAD(P) transhydrogenase, a human mitochondria|mitochondrial enzyme encoded by the NNT gene